James Colin Todd (1896 – 12 March 1916) was a Scottish professional footballer who played in the Scottish League for Raith Rovers as an outside forward.

Personal life
Todd worked as a railway clerk. After the outbreak of the First World War in August 1914, Todd enlisted as a private in the McCrae's Battalion of the Royal Scots. He was hit in the chest by shell fragments near Armentières, France on 12 March 1916 and died in a dugout shortly after, becoming the first footballer of the battalion to be killed in the war. He was buried in Erquinghem-Lys Churchyard Extension.

Honours 

 Raith Rovers Hall of Fame

References

Scottish footballers
1916 deaths
British Army personnel of World War I
British military personnel killed in World War I
1896 births
Footballers from Edinburgh
Royal Scots Fusiliers soldiers
Scottish Football League players
Raith Rovers F.C. players
Association football outside forwards
McCrae's Battalion
Clerks